Like all municipalities of Puerto Rico, Morovis is subdivided into administrative units called barrios, which are roughly comparable to minor civil divisions, (and means wards or boroughs or neighborhoods in English). The barrios and subbarrios, in turn, are further subdivided into smaller local populated place areas/units called sectores (sectors in English). The types of sectores may vary, from normally sector to urbanización to reparto to barriada to residencial, among others. Some sectors appear in two barrios.

List of sectors by barrio

Barahona
Carretera 633
Parcelas Barahona
Sector Cabachuelas I
Sector Germán Vega
Sector La Lomita
Sector Los Currás
Sector Siete Cuerdas
Sector VilLa Roca
Urbanización Brisas de Barahona
Urbanización Hacienda Las Marías
Urbanización Reparto Los Torres
Urbanización Valle San Luis
Valle Barahona

Cuchillas
Parcelas Juan José Otero Claverol
Sector Cuchillas
Sector El Bombo
Sector El Cocal
Sector Gobeo
Sector La Placita
Sector Las Ánimas
Sector Los Burgos
Sector Los Otero
Sector Los Reyes
Sector Pimiento
Sector Platanal
Sector Rosado
Sector Sandoval

Fránquez
Comunidad Fránquez
Sector Alianza
Sector Dávila
Sector Los Rosario
Sector Meléndez
Sector Narváez
Sector Pabón
Sector Pedro Meléndez Sánchez
Sector Rolón
Sector Rosado
Sector Socucho
Urbanización La Alianza

Monte Llano
Apartamentos Morovis Elderly
Apartamentos Parque del Retiro II
Avenida Corozal
Condominio Mariví
Residencial Padre Tomás Sorolla
Sector Avenida Patrón (Calle Patrón)
Sector El Tambor
Sector La Aldea
Sector La Fábrica
Sector La Trinchera
Tramo Carretera 159
Urbanización Colinas de Montellano
Urbanización Estancias de Montellano
Urbanización Jardines de Montellano
Urbanización Russe

Morovis barrio-pueblo

Avenida Buena Vista (Flamboyán)
Avenida Corozal
Barriada Ensanche
Barriada Santo Domingo
Calle Baldorioty Final (Acueducto)
Extensión Baldorioty
Sector Buenos Aires
Sector La Marina
Sector Pellejas
Sector Vietnam
Tramo Carretera 159 (Carol & Joe)
Urbanización Jardines de Flamboyán

Morovis Norte

Apartamentos Santiago
Sector Buena Vista
Sector El Cerro
Sector El Tendal
Sector Hoyo Frío
Sector La Línea
Sector Los Russe
Sector Puente Colorao
Urbanización Brisas del Norte
Urbanización Cruz Rosario
Urbanización Jardines de Romaní
Urbanización Las Cumbres
Urbanización Quintas de Morovis
Urbanización Tajaomar
Urbanización Villas Del Norte

Morovis Sud

Parcelas Padre Rosendo
Reparto Toñita Peña
Sector Del Carmen
Sector Garrochales
Sector Jobo
Sector La Coroza
Sector La Línea
Sector Las 40
Sector Palo de Pan
Sector Vereda
Tramo Carretera 155
Urbanización Palmas del Sur
Urbanización Praderas de Morovis Sur
Urbanización San Gabriel
Urbanización Vista Verde

Pasto
Sector Culebra
Sector Flamboyán
Sector Galán
Sector Limones
Sector Los Pérez
Sector Orquídeas
Sector Pasto
Sector Trinchera

Perchas
Sector Adrovet
Sector Arraijanes
Sector El Castillo
Sector El Zapato
Sector Los Naranjos
Sector Los Santos
Sector Perchas Díaz
Sector Perchas Quirós
Sector Perchas
Sector Radar
Tramo Carretera 155

Río Grande

Sector Delgado
Sector El Cerro
Sector Fontán
Sector La Playita
Sector Los Quendo
Tramo Carretera 155

San Lorenzo
Parcelas San Lorenzo
Sector Berio
Sector El Rayo
Sector El Salto
Sector La Prá
Sector Marrero

Torrecillas

Parcelas Extensión Torrecillas
Sector Cabachuelas II
Sector La Cuesta de los Guanos
Sector La Línea
Sector Las Lajas
Sector Ventana
Urbanización La Línea
Urbanización Tulipanes

Unibón
Parcelas Ramón Pabón
Sector Archilla
Sector El Puente
Sector Gallera
Sector Los Santos
Sector Padre Ibáñez
Sector Patrón
Sector Pedroza
Tramo Carretera 159
Urbanización Brisas del Río
Urbanización John Díaz
Urbanización Laderas del Río Unibón
Urbanización Matos
Urbanización Riberas de Unibón
Urbanización Rodríguez

Vaga
Sector Vaga
Sector Vaga 1
Sector Vaga 3

See also

 List of communities in Puerto Rico

References

External links
 

Morovis
Morovis